Belykh or Belyh (from белый meaning white) is a Russian surname. It may refer to:
Nikita Belykh,  Russian politician
Maksim Belyh (born 1984), Turkmen football player 
Sergey Belykh (born 1990), Russian cyclist
Yuri Belykh, Russian politician, governor of Saratov Oblast (1992–1996)

References

Russian-language surnames